Delpino is a surname. Notable people with the surname include:

Federico Delpino, Italian botanist
Robert Delpino (born 1964), American football player

Fictional characters
Vinnie Delpino, fictional character of Doogie Howser, M.D.

See also
14104 Delpino, a main-belt asteroid